SG Union Solingen was a German association football club from Solingen, North Rhine-Westphalia.

History 
The side can trace its roots back to an earlier Union Solingen club founded in 1897 out of the merger of a number of clubs from the district of Ohligs that would over time include Ohligs FC 06, VfR Ohligs, Walder Ballspielverein, and BV Adler Ohligs. Of the club's predecessor sides only VfR Ohligs would distinguish itself with any time spent in first-division football when they played the 1940–41 season in the Gauliga Niederrhein before being relegated on the heels of last place finish. 

In 1949, after World War II, the club was re-formed as Union Ohligs and began play in the 2nd Oberliga West (Gruppe 2). By the early 70s they were playing in the Amateurliga Niederrhein (III). A 1973 merger with VfL Wald Ohligs 1897 led to the formation of a club that played in the Regionalliga West (II) as Ohligs SC Solingen for a single season before being relegated. Renamed SG Union Solingen the next year, the team earned promotion to the 2.Bundesliga-Nord by the middle of the decade. They would stay fourteen seasons in the professional ranks with their best finishes being a fifth and sixth in 1984–85. Solingen returned to the Amateur-Oberliga Nordrhein (III) in 1989: by this time the club was suffering financially and would soon be bankrupt. In 1990 the club was dissolved.

Former coaches 
 Manfred Krafft (1986–1987)
 Eckhard Krautzun (1983)
 Erhard Ahmann † (1981–1982)
 Gerhard Prokop † (1980–1981)
 Horst Franz (1977–1980)
 Manfred Krafft (1970–1971)

Former players

Honours 
 Amateurliga Niederrhein champions: 1973, 1975
 Landesliga Niederrhein champions: 1969

References

External links 
 The Abseits Guide to German Soccer

 
Defunct football clubs in Germany
Defunct football clubs in North Rhine-Westphalia
Association football clubs established in 1949
1949 establishments in Germany
Association football clubs disestablished in 1990
1990 disestablishments in Germany
Solingen
2. Bundesliga clubs